In mathematics, the Poincaré lemma gives a sufficient condition for a closed differential form to be exact (while an exact form is necessarily closed). The lemma was introduced by Henri Poincaré in 1886.

In particular, it implies that the de Rham complex yields a resolution of the constant sheaf  on M. The singular cohomology of a contractible space vanishes in positive degree, but the Poincaré lemma does not follow from this, since the fact that the singular cohomology of a manifold can be computed as the de Rham cohomology of it, that is, the de Rham theorem, relies on the Poincaré lemma. It does, however, mean that it is enough to prove the Poincaré lemma for open balls; the version for contractible manifolds then follows from the topological consideration.

The Poincaré lemma is also a special case of the homotopy invariance of de Rham cohomology; in fact, it is common to establish the lemma by showing the homotopy invariance or at least a version of it.

Proofs

Direct proof
This case in particular covers the open ball case, since an open ball can be assumed to centered at the origin without loss of generality.

If , then a similar computation gives
.
Finally, let  and then set .

the formula known as the homotopy formula. The operator  is called the homotopy operator (also called a chain homotopy). Now, if  is closed, . Hence,

which proves the Poincaré lemma.

The same proof in fact shows the Poincaré lemma for any contractible open subset U of a manifold. Indeed, given such a U, we have the homotopy  with  the identity and  a point. Approximating such , we can assume  is in fact smooth. Hence, the same argument goes through.

Proof using Lie derivatives 
Cartan's magic formula for Lie derivatives can be used to give a short proof of the Poincaré lemma. The formula states that the Lie derivative along a vector field  is given as:

where  denotes the interior product; i.e., .

For a fixed t in the interior of I, let . Then . Thus, by the definition of a Lie derivative,
.
That is,

Assume .

where the integration means the integration of each coefficient in a differential form. Letting , we then have:

with the notation 

Now, assume  is an open ball with center ; then we can take . Then the above formula becomes:
,
which proves the Poincaré lemma when  is closed.

A standard proof of the Poincaré lemma uses the homotopy invariance formula and can be found here, in the above section (cf.

Proof in the two-dimensional case
In two dimensions the Poincaré lemma can be proved directly for closed 1-forms and 2-forms as follows.

Set

so that . The right hand side here is independent of x since its partial derivative with respect to x is 0. So

and hence

Implication to de Rham cohomology 
By definition, the k-th de Rham cohomology group  of an open subset U of a manifold M is defined as the quotient vector space

Now, differential forms determine a cochain complex called the de Rham complex:

where n = the dimension of M and  denotes the sheaf of differential k-forms; i.e.,  consists of k-forms on U for each open subset U of M. It then gives rise to the complex (the augmented complex)

Also, a sequence of sheaves is exact if and only if is so locally. The Poincaré lemma thus says the rest of the sequence is exact too (since each point has an open ball as a neighborhood). In the language of homological algebra, it means that the de Rham complex determines a resolution of the constant sheaf . This then implies the de Rham theorem; i.e., the de Rham cohomology of a manifold coincides with the singular cohomology of it (in short, because the singular cohomology can be viewed as a sheaf cohomology.)

Once one knows the de Rham theorem, the conclusion of the Poincaré lemma can then be obtained purely topologically. For example, it implies a version of the Poincaré lemma for simply connected open sets (see §Simply connected case).

Simply connected case 
Especially in calculus, the Poincaré lemma is stated for a simply connected open subset . In that case, the lemma says that each closed 1-form on U is exact. This version can be seen using algebraic topology as follows. The rational Hurewicz theorem (or rather the real analog of that) says that  since U is simply connected. Since  is a field, the k-th cohomology  is the dual vector space of the k-th homology . In particular,  By the de Rham theorem (which follows from the Poincaré lemma for open balls),  is the same as the first de Rham cohomology group (see §Implication to de Rham cohomology). Hence, each closed 1-form on U is exact.

Complex-geometry analog
The local exactness result for such closed forms is known as the Dolbeault–Grothendieck lemma (or -Poincaré lemma). Importantly, the geometry of the domain on which a -closed differential form is -exact is more restricted than for the Poincaré lemma, since the proof of the Dolbeault–Grothendieck lemma holds on a polydisk (a product of disks in the complex plane, on which the multidimensional Cauchy's integral formula may be applied) and there exist counterexamples to the lemma even on contractible domains. The -Poincaré lemma holds in more generality for pseudoconvex domains.

Using both the Poincaré lemma and the -Poincaré lemma, a refined local -Poincaré lemma can be proven, which is valid on domains upon which both the aforementioned lemmas are applicable. This lemma states that -closed complex differential forms are actually locally -exact (rather than just  or -exact, as implied by the above lemmas).

Relative Poincaré lemma 
The relative Poincaré lemma generalizes Poincaré lemma from a point to a submanifold (or some more general locally closed subset). It states: let V be a submanifold of a manifold M and U a tubular neighborhood of V. If  is a closed k-form on U, k ≥ 1, that vanishes on V, then there exists a (k-1)-form  on U such that  and  vanishes on V.

The relative Poincaré lemma can be proved in the same way the original Poincaré lemma is proved. Indeed, since U is a tubular neighborhood, there is a smooth strong deformation retract from U to V; i.e., there is a smooth homotopy  from the projection  to the identity such that  is the identity on V. Then we have the homotopy formula on U:

where  is the homotopy operator given by either Lie derivatives or integration along fibers. Now,  and so . That  vanishes on V follows from the definition of J and the fact . (So the proof actually goes through if U is not a tubular neighborhood but if U deformation-retracts to V with homotopy relative to V.)

On singular spaces 
The Poincaré lemma generally fails for singular spaces. For example, if one considers algebraic differential forms on a complex algebraic variety (in the Zariski topology), the lemma is not true for those differential forms.

However, the variants of the lemma still likely hold for some singular spaces (precise formulation and proof depend on the definitions of such spaces and non-smooth differential forms on them.) For example, Kontsevich and Soibelman claim the lemma holds for certain variants of different forms (called PA forms) on their piecewise algebraic spaces.

Notes

References 
Luc Illusie, Around the Poincaré lemma, after Beilinson, talk notes 2012

Further reading 
https://ncatlab.org/nlab/show/Poincaré+lemma
https://mathoverflow.net/questions/287385/p-adic-poincaré-lemma

Differential forms
Lemmas in analysis
Henri Poincaré